

Men's events

Women's events

1963
1963 Pan American Games
Pan American Games
International fencing competitions hosted by Brazil